I Love Hong Kong 2013 is a 2013 Hong Kong comedy film and the third film of the I Love Hong Kong film series. Film stars Alan Tam, Veronica Yip, Natalis Chan and Eric Tsang, who also served as producer. This is also Veronica Yip's first film role since 1996's Hong Kong Showgirls. The film was released on 7 February 2013 to celebrate Chinese New Year.

Cast

Main cast

Other cast

Reception
Andrew Chan of the Film Critics Circle of Australia writes, "One of the reasons why "I Love Hong Kong 2013″ works, is because it touches upon relevant Hong Kong people concerns and the sentimental value that people place on long lost Hong Kong culture in the rapidly changing territory. "

I Love Hong Kong 2013 earned HK$16,894,784 at the Hong Kong box office.

References

External links
Official website
 

Hong Kong comedy films
2013 films
2013 comedy films
2010s Cantonese-language films
Films set in the 1970s
Films set in Hong Kong
Films shot in Hong Kong
Shaw Brothers Studio films
2010s Hong Kong films